You is the sixth studio album by American post-punk band Tuxedomoon, released in 1987 by Cramboy.

Track listing

Personnel 
Adapted from the You liner notes.

Tuxedomoon
 Steven Brown – saxophone, keyboards, vocals
 Peter Dachert (as Peter Principle) – bass guitar, guitar
 Ivan Georgiev – keyboards, bass guitar
 Bruce Geduldig – vocals
 Luc Van Lieshout – trumpet, keyboards

Production and additional personnel
 Frankie Lievaart – production, recording
 Saskia Lupini – cover art
 Gilles Martin – production, recording
 Tuxedomoon – production

Release history

References

External links 
 

1987 albums
Tuxedomoon albums
Crammed Discs albums